Datuk Mohd Jidin bin Shafee (born 4 April 1956) is a Malaysian politician. He was a one-term Member of the Parliament of Malaysia for the Setiu constituency in Terengganu, Malaysia from 2008 to 2013. Mohd Jidin also holds the seat of Permaisuri in the State Assembly of Terengganu for three times (1995-1999, 2004-2008 and 2013–2018). His long tenure in the assembly, which included a stint as a member of the State Executive Council, was interrupted in 2008 when he was elected to the Parliament of Malaysia for the seat of Setiu.  He returned to the State Assembly in the 2013 election, in his old seat of Permaisuri, and was reappointed to the Executive Council with responsibilities for tourism, information, communications and culture.

He was conferred the title of Datuk in 2007.

Election results

Honours

Honours of Malaysia
  :
  Member of the Order of the Defender of the Realm (AMN) (2001)
  :
  Companion 1st Class of the Exalted Order of Malacca (DMSM) – Datuk (2007)

References

1956 births
Living people
People from Terengganu
Malaysian people of Malay descent
Malaysian Muslims
United Malays National Organisation politicians
Members of the Dewan Rakyat
Members of the Terengganu State Legislative Assembly
Terengganu state executive councillors